Rong Ningning (born 5 October 1997) is a Chinese freestyle wrestler. She won the gold medal in the women's 57 kg event at the 2018 World Wrestling Championships held in Budapest, Hungary.

Career 

In 2017, she competed in the 58 kg event at the World Wrestling Championships in Paris, France where she reached the quarterfinals after defeating Jowita Wrzesień and Pooja Dhanda in earlier rounds. In the quarterfinals she was defeated by Marwa Amri who went on to win the silver medal in that event. Rong then entered the repechage where she won her match against Iryna Chykhradze of Ukraine but lost her bronze medal match against Aisuluu Tynybekova of Kyrgyzstan.

In 2018, at the Golden Grand Prix Ivan Yarygin 2018 held in Krasnoyarsk, Russia, she won the gold medal in the women's 59 kg event.

In 2019, at the World Wrestling Championships held in Nur-Sultan, Kazakhstan, she won the silver medal in the women's 57 kg event. In the same year, she also won the gold medal in the women's 57 kg event at the 2019 Asian Wrestling Championships held in Xi'an, China.

She represented China at the 2020 Summer Olympics in Tokyo, Japan. She competed in the women's 57 kg event.

Major results

References

External links 
 

Living people
1997 births
Place of birth missing (living people)
Chinese female sport wrestlers
World Wrestling Championships medalists
World Wrestling Champions
Asian Wrestling Championships medalists
Wrestlers at the 2020 Summer Olympics
Olympic wrestlers of China
21st-century Chinese women